Daniel Schütz (born 19 June 1991) is an Austrian professional footballer who plays in Austria for SKN St. Pölten. He plays as a midfielder.

Schütz has represented his native Austria at Under-17 level. Schütz appeared in the Austria U-17 team for their unsuccessful 2008 UEFA European Under-17 Football Championship qualifying round campaign.

External links

1991 births
Living people
Austrian footballers
Austria youth international footballers
Association football midfielders
Grazer AK players
FC Wacker Innsbruck (2002) players
SV Grödig players
SKN St. Pölten players
Austrian Football Bundesliga players
People from Voitsberg
Footballers from Styria